Sarah Bolton may refer to:

Sarah Knowles Bolton (1841–1916), American writer
Sarah T. Bolton (1814–1893), American poet
Sarah Bolton (physicist), American scientist, college administrator and president of the College of Wooster